Katica Ivanišević (born 11 January 1935 in Omišalj) is a retired Croatian university professor and politician who served as the 2nd Speaker of the Chamber of Counties of Croatia, formerly the upper house of the Croatian Parliament, from 1994 until the chamber's abolition by constitutional changes in 2001. She was the first and to date only woman to serve as parliamentary speaker in an independent Croatia.

Ivanišević is a professor emeritus of the University of Rijeka. She specialized in American literature. She was the first woman rector in Croatia, serving as a rector of the University of Rijeka.

Sources
 Prof. emeritus Katica Ivanišević - dobitnica nagrade PGŽ-a za životno djelo 

1935 births
Croatian Democratic Union politicians
20th-century Croatian women politicians
20th-century Croatian politicians
University of Ljubljana alumni
Academic staff of the University of Rijeka
Living people
Croatian literary historians
Women literary historians
Rectors of universities in Croatia